Ulla Strand (21 March 1943 - 7 August 2007) (born as Ulla Rasmussen) was badminton player of Denmark who excelled from the early 1960s to the early 1970s. Though she won three Danish national singles titles and reached the women's singles final at the All-England Championships in 1965, most of her major championship victories were in doubles (often with her sister Karin Jorgensen) and mixed doubles. Attractive and charismatic, she was a crowd favorite throughout her career.

She was included in the Badminton Hall of Fame in 1999. Ulla Strand died in 2007 after a long illness.

Career 
Strand won 10 All England Open Badminton Championships titles, 7 in mixed doubles and 3 in women's doubles. She also won 21 Danish National Championships between 1961 and 1974, and 19 Nordic Championships between 1962 and 1973.

1972 Summer Olympics 
Strand competed in badminton at the 1972 Summer Olympics, as a demonstration sport competition. In women's singles, she lost in the first round against Noriko Nakayama, 11-5, 11-9. In mixed doubles she played with Svend Pri, and they were beaten in the final by Derek Talbot and Gillian Gilks of Great Britain, 15-6, 18-16.

Major achievements

Achievements

International tournaments 
Mixed doubles

References

External links

Ulla Strand's Profile - BadmintonDenmark.com

Danish female badminton players
Badminton players at the 1972 Summer Olympics
1943 births
2007 deaths
Sportspeople from Copenhagen